Sonora State Highway 163 (Carretera Estatal 163) is a highway in the south of the Mexican state of Sonora.

It runs from Navojoa Airport to the junction with Mexican Federal Highway 15. Its total length is 1.4 km.

References

163